The 2006 WNBL Finals was the postseason tournament of the WNBL's 2005–06 season. The Dandenong Rangers were the two-time defending champions, but were defeated in the Grand Final by the Canberra Capitals, 68–55.

Standings

Bracket

Semi-finals

(1) Dandenong Rangers  vs. (2) Adelaide Fellas

(3) Canberra Capitals  vs. (4) Bulleen Boomers

Preliminary final

(2) Adelaide Fellas vs. (3) Canberra Capitals

Grand Final

(1) Dandenong Rangers vs. (3) Canberra Capitals

Rosters

References 

2006 Finals
2005-06
Women's National Basketball League Finals
2005–06 in Australian basketball
Aus
basketball
basketball